The National Collegiate Open Wrestling Championship is a collegiate wrestling event that serves as a post season championship for NCAA Division-I athletes that are not wrestling in their conference championship.  The event is traditionally known for the redshirting wrestlers entered but often includes accomplished and seasoned wrestlers that were unable to make their program's starting line-up.

Expansion into Divisions
Starting with the 2013 Championship in Richmond, Virginia, the National Collegiate Open will split NCAA Division-I athletes from the rest of the field.  The Division-I division is called the University Division while the College Division will serve the athletes from the other NCAA divisions, as well as NAIA, USCAA, and NJCAA.

Criticisms
Though the National Collegiate Open is attended by the majority of the NCAA Division-I wrestling programs, the event has been criticised for having a field that has too many athletes from the east coast, absent of some of the strongest college wrestling programs.  The 2011 season brought more legitimacy when the University of Missouri and the University of Oklahoma attended for the first time but the claim has been made, by some in the wrestling community, that the event will not be a true national event until the three most storied programs (University of Iowa, Oklahoma State University, and University of Minnesota) decide to attend. Note: University of Minnesota attended the 2012 event.

Most NCO Champions at single Championship

Most NCO All-Americans at single Championship

All-Time NCO Individual Championships by School

References

External links 
 NationalCollegiateOpen.com

College wrestling championships